Vladimír Skovajsa (4 May 1929 – 24 May 2002) was a Slovak swimmer. He competed in the men's 200 metre breaststroke at the 1952 Summer Olympics.

References

1929 births
2002 deaths
Slovak male swimmers
Olympic swimmers of Czechoslovakia
Swimmers at the 1952 Summer Olympics
People from Nové Mesto nad Váhom
Sportspeople from the Trenčín Region